Moulay Yacoub ( mūlāy yaʿqūb) is a spa town and municipality located 21 km northwest of Fez, Morocco. It is the capital of Moulay Yacoub Province and reported a population of 4612 in the 2014 Moroccan census. The baths use water pumped from 1500 m below ground and reach a temperature of 54 °C.

References

Populated places in Fès-Meknès
Provincial capitals in Morocco
Hot springs